Bucyrus may refer to:

Places in the United States
 Bucyrus, Kansas
 Bucyrus, Missouri
 Bucyrus, North Dakota
 Bucyrus, Ohio
 Bucyrus Township (disambiguation)

Other uses
 Bucyrus International, a mining and earth-moving equipment manufacturer, now owned by Caterpillar, Inc.